Maseko is an African surname that may refer to

Andries Maseko (1955–2013), South African football striker
Gertrude Maseko, First Lady of Malawi
Jevan Maseko (1943–2013), Zimbabwean military officer and government official
Job Maseko (died 1952), South African soldier during World War II
Lorna Maseko (born 1983), South African actress and media personality
Owen Maseko (born in 1974 or 1975), Zimbabwean visual artist
Sinegugu Maseko (born 1997), South African cricketer
Sizo Maseko (born 1991), South African rugby union player
Themba Maseko (born 1961), South African politician
Thulani Maseko, (born 1970) Swaziland human rights lawyer assassinated in 2023
Zola Maseko (born 1967), Swazi film director and screenwriter

See also
Maseko v Maseko, a 1990 case in South African contract law
Masego
Surnames of South African origin

Bantu-language surnames
Malawian surnames
Surnames of Swaziland origin